Charles McAllen (2 July 1860 – 15 January 1924) was an Australian cricketer. He played ten first-class matches for Tasmania between 1889 and 1901.

See also
 List of Tasmanian representative cricketers

References

External links
 

1860 births
1924 deaths
Australian cricketers
Tasmania cricketers
Cricketers from Hobart